Gunnar Jackson (born 6 July 1986) is a New Zealand professional boxer. At regional level he held the NZPBA super middleweight title from 2012 to 2013; the NZPBA middleweight title in 2013; and the WBO Oriental middleweight title twice between 2013 and 2015.

Professional career
Jackson fought the biggest fight of his career in January 2014 against four-time world champion Anthony Mundine. Jackson lost by unanimous points decision.

Jackson fought Kerry Hope in June 2015. Hope was originally scheduled to fight Michael Zerafa for the Interim WBO Oriental Middleweight title, but Zerafa pulled out days before the fight. Jackson took the fight on only a few days notice, defending his WBO Oriental Middleweight Title. Jackson again lost by unanimous points decision.

Professional boxing record

Titles

|-

|-

|-

|-

Awards and recognitions
2019 Gladrap Boxing Awards New Zealand fight of the year (Nominated)

References

1986 births
New Zealand professional boxing champions
Living people
Sportspeople from Lower Hutt
Sportspeople from Tauranga
New Zealand male boxers
Middleweight boxers